Željko Malčić (born 15 November 1981) is a Croatian football forward, who currently plays for German amateur side FV Öschelbronn.

References

External links
 

1981 births
Living people
Sportspeople from Vinkovci
Association football forwards
Croatian footballers
HNK Cibalia players
HNK Šibenik players
NK Junak Sinj players
NK GOŠK Gabela players
HNK Primorac Biograd na Moru players
Croatian Football League players
First Football League (Croatia) players
First League of the Federation of Bosnia and Herzegovina players
Croatian expatriate footballers
Expatriate footballers in Bosnia and Herzegovina
Croatian expatriate sportspeople in Bosnia and Herzegovina
Expatriate footballers in Germany
Croatian expatriate sportspeople in Germany